Below is a list of events in chess in the year 1902:

News

 Géza Maróczy (Hungary) wins the Monte Carlo tournament, ahead of Harry Pillsbury (United States) and Dawid Janowski (France).
 March 14–15 – The United States team wins the Anglo-American cable match 5½–4½.  Harry Pillsbury and Frank Marshall are in Europe to play at Monte Carlo, so they traveled to London to play their games in person.
 Janowski wins the German Open Championship, followed by Pillsbury and Henry Ernest Atkins (Great Britain).
 Karl Schlechter (Austria) defeats Janowski in match at Karlsbad by the score 7½–2½.

Births

 Eduard Glass (died after 1980), Austrian  master and 1929 Austrian co-champion with Erich Eliskases
 Ludwig Schmitt (1902–1980), German chess master
 January 16 – Róża Herman (1902–1995), Polish chess player, is born in Łódź
 February 20 – Virgilio Fenoglio (1902–1990), Argentine master, is born in Santa Fe
 March 16 – Mario Monticelli (1902–1995), Italian IM (1950) and GME (1985), is born in Venice
 June 5 – Georg Kieninger (1902–1975), German International Master (1950), is born in Munich
 July 27 – Teodors Bergs (1902–1966), Latvian master, is born in Riga
 August 5 – Rudolf Pitschak (1902–1988), Czech–German master, is born in Rumburk
 October 15 – María Teresa Mora (1902–1980), Cuban Woman International Master (1950), is born in Havana
 December 3 – Feliks Kibbermann (1902–1993), Estonian master, is born in Rakvere
 December 6 – G. H. Diggle (1902–1993), British chess player and writer, is born in Moulton, Lincolnshire, England

Deaths

 Samuel Rosenthal, Polish-French master and chess writer, dies Neuilly-sur-Seine, France, at age 65
 June 15 – Stanislaus Sittenfeld, Polish-French master, dies in Davos, Switzerland, at age 36
 December 28 – Hieronim Czarnowski, Polish master and activist, dies at age 68

References

 
20th century in chess
Chess by year